is a Japanese coming-of-age manga series written and illustrated by Hiromu Arakawa. It was serialized in Shogakukan's Weekly Shōnen Sunday from April 2011 to November 2019. The story is set in the fictional Ooezo Agricultural High School in Hokkaido, and depicts the daily life of Yuugo Hachiken, a high school student from Sapporo who enrolled at Ooezo Agricultural High School fleeing from the demands of his strict father. However, he soon learns that life on an agricultural school is not as easy as he initially believed. Unlike his new classmates, he has no intention of following an agricultural career after graduating, although he envies them for already having set goals for their lives and the pursuit of their dreams.

An anime television series adaptation produced by A-1 Pictures aired for two seasons between July and September 2013 and January and March 2014 on Fuji TV's noitaminA block. A live-action film based on the manga produced by Toho was released in March 2014.

As of February 2020, the manga had over 17 million copies in circulation. It won the 5th Manga Taishō in 2012, the 58th Shogakukan Manga Award in the shōnen category and the Japan Food Culture Contents Award, both in 2013.

Plot
After failing to pass the entrance examinations for the high school he planned to attend, mild-mannered student Yuugo Hachiken moves away from his suburban home and enrolls at the rural  – often abbreviated as  – in the countryside. His relationship with his family is strained at the start of the story, which influences his decision to attend a school far from home. He continues to worry about his future career over the course of the series. He soon finds himself slowly getting used to his new environment despite some initial struggles, and grows into an empathetic and compassionate individual as he struggles to understand the world of agriculture and how it affects the lives of his new friends.

Characters

A city boy from Sapporo. After failing to pass the entrance exams for the high school he plans to attend, Yuugo decided to enroll at Ezo, expecting an easier academic workload. However, he is proven wrong. Due to his strict upbringing by his father, he is unable to refuse when someone needs his help. Despite complaining when he feels that people abuse his generosity, Yuugo quickly earns the friendship and respect of his peers. Yuugo joins the Equestrian Club alongside his classmate Aki and rises to the position of Vice President of the club. Yuugo is usually anxious about his future as, unlike his classmates who already have their goals in life, he is still wondering about what career he should choose. Much of Yuugo's animosity towards his family is a result of being compared to his more successful older brother, Shingo, and the seemingly uncaring hostility of his father. He has a crush on Aki, and they officially start dating after Aki got accepted into university.

Aki is a first-year student who is also a member of the Equestrian Club. As the only child of her family, she entered Ezo to study so that she would inherit her family business—a cow and horse farm specializing in raising Ban'ei race horses. She is wary of Yuugo at first. At first, is friendly and seems easygoing. However, she keeps her desires bottled up and pushes people away from her problems. She has poor grades, though, according to Yuugo, better than Keiji's. Later, her family experiences financial difficulties and is forced to sell all their horses. After this event, Aki confesses her true desires for the future, and—encouraged by Yuugo—expresses her will to work with horses professionally instead of inheriting the farm. She then starts studying (partly because of her poor grades) to enter college with Yuugo as her personal tutor. She slowly develops feelings for Yuugo, and they officially start dating after she gets accepted into university.

A classmate of Yuugo and a member of the Dairy Farming program. Her dream is to open her own cheese factory.

One of Yuugo's close friends at Ezo and a skilled baseball player. Ichiro is Aki's childhood friend and neighbor which is initially a source of jealousy for Yuugo. Ichiro dreams of becoming a professional baseball player to earn money to improve his family's small dairy farm. However, his family goes bankrupt and their farm is sold to pay their debt. As a result, he is forced to quit Ezo and look for a job to make ends meet and support his mother and sisters.

Another close friend of Yuugo, Shinnosuke aims to become a veterinarian after graduation. His goal, however, is complicated by his tendency to faint at the sight of blood. He is a member of the Holstein Club.

A wealthy classmate of Yuugo whose family runs a huge industrial farm. She is usually an obese girl, but she hides under the extra fat a quite beautiful figure that reveals itself occasionally when she works too hard or goes on a quick diet. However, she has to regain her weight because she feels weak when she is thinner. Obsessed with money, Tamako's goal is to take over her family's farm (humorously depicted as a "hostile takeover" by her parents), and expand it and make it more profitable.

A close friend of Yuugo who has a talent of getting himself in trouble due to his difficulty studying (which has humorously become Yuugo's means of gauging Aki's and even his dog Vice President's learning abilities) and his habit of jumping to conclusions, much to his friends' chagrin--even putting Yuugo and Mayumi in the hot seat once. His family owns a chicken farm.

A close friend of Yuugo who is a huge otaku. He is sensible and mature and often gives Yuugo good advice. He cares for his friends and is very intelligent, knowing a lot about the crops and their economic value, and technology. He hopes to attend a college of university in Tokyo, mainly because, as he claims, Tokyo is the land of otaku.

An aristocratic girl to a vast agriculture fortune and childhood rival to Aki Mikage. She often gets Hachiken's name wrong by replacing the Hachi (8) part of his name with different numbers, calling him "Shichiken" (7) and "Jūhachiken" (18). In the anime, she came to Ezo late in the second season (to fill up the slot vacated by Ichiro), but she is in Ezo from the beginning in the movie.

A first year student and Yuugo's roommate. He will often help out Yuugo, such as the doing the chores he forgot about. He is in the Food Sciences program.

Yuugo's older brother who managed to get accepted to the University of Tokyo, the most prestigious university in Japan. However, Shingo later quit once he realized his father's dream was to have one of his sons accepted there. He decides to pursue his own dream of becoming a great cook, and travels the country in his underbone bike to perfect his cooking skills, often with humorously questionable results. He often drops by Ezo unannounced to check on Yuugo, since Yuugo usually refuses to talk with his family. Shingo is carefree and outgoing which is often a source of animosity from Yuugo, but he becomes a little more responsible after marrying Alexandra, a young Russian girl he meets during his travels.

Production
After the completion of her successful fantasy series Fullmetal Alchemist, author Hiromu Arakawa and her publisher Shogakukan agreed that she should begin the more realistic Silver Spoon as a way to challenge herself as a manga artist and recruit new readers. Having grown up in a rural setting, many elements of the manga are drawn from Arakawa's experiences in her youth. For instance, characters such as the piggery teacher Ichiko Fuji and members of the Holstein fanclub are based on individuals she knew in her high school. Though the story contains matters like the protagonist Yuugo Hachiken's ethical dilemma over animal slaughter, Arakawa insists Silver Spoon is not a "green" manga. She states that she simply wants to tell the story of a high schooler's maturation, similar to how Fullmetal Alchemist focuses on the development of the main character Edward Elric rather than promoting alchemy.

Silver Spoon began its publication in Weekly Shōnen Sunday on April 6, 2011. It was serialized regularly until August 2014 when Arakawa announced she would slow the pace of producing new chapters of the manga so that she could care for a family member in declining health. After an eight-month hiatus, the manga briefly resumed in April 2015 until another short hiatus was announced the following month. After the release of the manga's 13th volume, the author announced its "imminent" conclusion. She later explained that she had originally planned to depict Yuugo's first year at Ooezo in detail, followed by rushed second year and shortened third year, and his eventual life after graduation. In 2016, new chapters were published from January to February and August to September. The manga went on hiatus in July 2017, after three chapters were published. Four new chapters were published between May and June 2018. In October 2019, it was announced that the manga would enter its final arc in the 49th issue of Weekly Shōnen Sunday on November 6, 2019, and it would end in four chapters. The manga finished in the 52nd issue of Weekly Shōnen Sunday on November 27, 2019.

Media

Manga
Influenced by Arakawa's own life experience, as she was raised in a dairy farm in Hokkaido, Silver Spoon was launched in the 19th issue of Shogakukan's Weekly Shōnen Sunday magazine on April 6, featured on the cover. It became one of the magazine's main features not long after. The manga finished in the 52nd issue of Weekly Shōnen Sunday on November 27, 2019. The individual chapters have been compiled by Shogakukan into fifteen tankōbon volumes from July 15, 2011 to February 18, 2020.

The manga has been licensed for English-language release in Singapore by Shogakukan Asia, while in North America, Yen Press announced the acquisition of the manga in July 2017 and published the first volume on February 27, 2018.

Volume list

Anime
An anime television series produced by A-1 Pictures aired from July 11 to September 19, 2013. Tomohiko Itō directed the series with assistant director Kotomi Deai. Taku Kishimoto wrote the scripts, while Jun Nakai served as character designer and chief animation director, and Shusei Murai scored the music. A second season aired from January 9 to March 27, 2014. For the first season, the opening theme is "Kiss you" by miwa, while the ending theme is "Hello Especially" by Sukima Switch. For the second season, the opening theme is "Life" by Fujifabric and the ending theme is "Oto no Naru Hō e" by Goose House.

The anime has been licensed by Aniplex of America for streaming and home video in North America. Aniplex of America released the first season on DVD on July 15, 2014.

Episode list

Season 1

Season 2

Live-action film
A live-action film based on the manga was officially announced in the Nikkan Sports and Sports Nippon newspapers on August 7, 2013. Kento Nakajima played Yuugo Hachiken, with Alice Hirose as Aki Mikage and Tomohiro Ichikawa as Ichiro Komaba. The film was directed by Keisuke Yoshida, with the production companies TBS and Wilco and the distributor Toho. It premiered in Tokyo on March 7, 2014, and was also shown at the Japan Film Festival of San Francisco on July 22, 2014. The film's theme song is "Hidamari", performed by Yuzu. Iwasawa Koji wrote and composed the song for the movie.

Reception

Manga

Sales
Since its first volume, Silver Spoon had been well received by readers. It became the fastest Shogakukan title at the time to reach the mark of one million first printing copies, a year and three months after the manga was launched. According to Oricon, it was also the 7th best-selling manga in Japan in 2012, and the top selling title from Shogakukan, as well as the top selling title of 2012 not yet to have an anime adaption. By October 2013 it has sold 12 million copies in Japan. As of 2014 the series has sold over 15 million copies in Japan. As of July, 2017, the manga had over 16 million copies in print. As of February 2020, the manga had over 17 million copies in print.

Awards
Silver Spoon ranked #2 on the "Nationwide Bookstore Employees' Recommended Comics" by the Honya Club website in 2012. Silver Spoon won the 5th Manga Taishō Award's Grand Prize in 2012, and the 58th Shogakukan Manga Award (shōnen category) in 2013. In 2013 Silver Spoon won the first Japan Food Culture Contents Award. It was one of nine nominees for the 19th annual Tezuka Osamu Cultural Prize in 2015.

Reviews
Publishers Weekly concluded that the work is "a side of Japanese high school life seldom seen in manga, making for an irresistible series." Barnes & Noble listed Silver Spoon on their list of "Our Favorite Manga of 2018".

Anime
In November 2019, Crunchyroll listed Silver Spoon in their "Top 100 best anime of the 2010s".

See also
Moyasimon: Tales of Agriculture – a similar manga and anime series by Masayuki Ishikawa, set at a fictional agricultural university

References

External links
 
 

2011 manga
2013 anime television series debuts
A-1 Pictures
Agriculture and farming in anime and manga
Anime series based on manga
Anime and manga set in Hokkaido
Aniplex
Comedy anime and manga
Coming-of-age anime and manga
Cooking in anime and manga
Hiromu Arakawa
Japanese comedy films
Manga adapted into films
Manga Taishō
Noitamina
School life in anime and manga
Shogakukan franchises
Shogakukan manga
Shōnen manga
Slice of life anime and manga
Television shows about agriculture
Winners of the Shogakukan Manga Award for shōnen manga
Yen Press titles